David or Dave Ford may refer to:

Arts and entertainment
David Ford (actor) (1925–1983), American character actor
Terry Harknett (a.k.a. "David Ford", 1936–2019), British novelist
David Ford (musician) (born 1978), British singer-songwriter and guitarist

Sports
David Ford (footballer) (born 1945), English professional footballer
Dave Ford (born 1956), American baseball player
David Ford (kayaker) (born 1967), Canadian whitewater slalom kayaker

Others
David Everard Ford (1797–1875), English minister, author, and hymn composer
David Ford (civil servant) (1935–2017), British civil servant; last non-Chinese Chief Secretary of Hong Kong
David Ford (marketing scientist) (born 1944), British organizational theorist 
David F. Ford (born 1948), Irish Anglican theologian
David Ford (politician) (born 1951), British politician; leader of the Alliance Party of Northern Ireland

See also
David Forde (disambiguation)